Rocket Internet SE is a German Internet company headquartered in Berlin. The company builds startups and owns shareholdings in various models of internet retail businesses. The company model is known as a startup studio or a venture builder.

It provides office space to new companies at its headquarters in Berlin, with IT support, marketing services and access to investors.  As of 2016, Rocket Internet has more than 28,000 employees across its worldwide network of companies, which consists of over 100 entities active in 110 countries. The company's market capitalization was €3.49 billion as of November 3, 2017. On July 12, 2021, the market capitalization was €3.7 billion.

History 
 

The company was founded in Berlin in 2007 by three brothers: Marc, Oliver and Alexander Samwer and was once also connected to the European Founders Fund, an associated company.

In 2008, Rocket Internet founded Zalando, emulating the business model of US online retailer Zappos.com.

On July 1, 2014, Rocket Internet changed its legal form from a GmbH (private limited company) to an AG (public limited company). The initial public offering took place on October 2, 2014 on the Frankfurt Stock Exchange at €42.50 per share. The company was listed in the Entry Standard and got uplisted in Prime Standard on September 26, 2016. In October 2016 it was announced that Rocket Internet replaces Chorus Clean Energy AG in SDAX. Rocket Internet SE joined the MDAX index of German mid-cap stocks on March 19, 2018. This decision was announced by Deutsche Börse AG (Frankfurt Stock Exchange) on March 5, 2018. On March 18, 2015 the company changed its legal form into an SE (Societas Europaea). 

In mid-December 2016, Global Founders held 37.1% in Rocket Internet, Kinnevik 13.2%, United Internet 8.3%, Baillie Gifford 6.5%, Philippine Long Distance Telephone Company 6.1% and Access Industries 6.0%. 

Holtzbrinck Ventures held a 1.8% share, with main investors holding shares of 3.4%; 16.3% was held in free float. In January 2017, Rocket Internet Capital Partners announced its final closing of $1 billion dedicated to early stage and growth equity investments. It is the biggest tech fund of any VC firm to date in Europe.

On September 1, 2020, Rocket Internet announced it delisting. As of February 2021, Rocket Internet was recognized as one of the top startup studios based on website traffic to its top 3 portfolio companies.

The network of companies 
Rocket Internet follows the strategy of building companies on the basis of proven Internet-based business models. According to Rocket Internet's financial statements the company especially concentrates on Food & Groceries, Fashion, Home & Living and Travel. 

In addition to the companies in the five industry sectors, Rocket Internet owns stakes in companies at varying maturity stages, ranging from recently launched models to companies that are in the process of establishing leadership positions or still expanding their geographic reach.

Rocket Internet's current portfolio englobes the following companies:

 Agencasa.it
 bluenest
 everstox
 expertlead
 Flash Coffee
 Global Fashion Group
 Global Savings Group
 Helpling
 Home24
 Instafreight
 Jeeny
 Katoo
 Baly
 Loadsmile
 Nestpick
 Payflow
 Spenmo
 Spotcap
 tinvio
 vitable

Divestments 

Rocket Internet's past investments include shares in the following companies:

 Campsy
 Carmudi
 Carspring
 ClickBus
 Dafiti
 Daraz
 Delivery Hero
 Easy Taxi
 HelloFresh
 Hellofood
 Jumia
 Jumia Market
 Jumia Travel
 Kaymu
 Lamudi
 Lazada
 Linio
 OpenRent
 Printvenue
 Spotcap
 The Iconic
 Westwing
 Zalando
 Zalora Group
 Zipjet

Controversy 
The company has been criticised for its "copycat" strategy of founding startups which replicate the business models of other established, successful companies.

In 2011, 20 of the then-130 employees left Rocket Internet at the same time. According to media coverage at the time, the reason for this string of layoffs was "bad quality of new products" and a "gruff manner" towards employees in the course of Rocket Internet's expansion into a "large corporation". The former Rocket Internet managers subsequently went on to found the incubator Project A Ventures with help from the Otto Group.

Questions were raised around Rocket's support of multiple competing companies in a particular business sector. Rocket Internet's original backing of both Take Eat Easy and Delivery Hero was questioned when Take Eat Easy was forced into liquidation in July 2016.

References

Further reading
 Rocket Internet backed Global Savings Group raises €19M. Global Savings Group: Investoren gehen auf Schnäppchenjagd. 19 October 2017
 
 
 
 
 
 

 
Companies based in Berlin
German companies established in 2008
Business incubators of Germany
Companies in the MDAX